The Ambassador of the United Kingdom to Uzbekistan is the United Kingdom's foremost diplomatic representative to the Republic of Uzbekistan, and head of the UK's diplomatic mission in Tashkent.

Ambassadors
1993–1995: Paul Bergne
1995–1999: Barbara Hay
1999–2002: Christopher Ingham
2002–2004: Craig Murray
2005–2007: David Moran
2007–2009: Iain Kelly
2009–2012: Rupert Joy
2012–2015: George Edgar
2015–2019: Christopher Allan

2019–: Timothy Torlot

References

External links
UK and Uzbekistan, gov.uk

Uzbekistan
 
United Kingdom